Constituent Assembly may refer to the Constituent Assembly in the following countries;
Constituent Assembly of Georgia
Constituent Assembly of India
Constituent Assembly of Italy
Constituent Assembly of Lithuania
Constituent Assembly of Luxembourg
Constituent Assembly of Nepal
Constituent Assembly of Pakistan
Constituent Assembly of the Republic of Montenegro
Constituent Assembly of Tunisia
Constituent Assembly of Turkey
Constituent Assembly  (Philippines)